Geoffrey Thomas McLaren (1 February 1921 – 30 January 1992) was an Australian politician. Born in Koroit, Victoria, he was educated at state schools before becoming a shearer. In the 1950s he moved to Murray Bridge in South Australia, where he later became a poultry farmer. In 1970, he was elected to the Australian Senate as a Labor Senator for South Australia. He held the seat until his retirement in 1983. McLaren died in 1992.

References

Australian Labor Party members of the Parliament of Australia
Members of the Australian Senate for South Australia
Members of the Australian Senate
Australian farmers
1921 births
1992 deaths
20th-century Australian politicians